Eremocossus is a genus of moths in the family Cossidae first described by George Hampson in 1893.

Species
 Eremocossus almeriana (de Freina & Witt, 1990)
 Eremocossus asema (Püngeler, 1899)
 Eremocossus foedus (Swinhoe, 1884)
 Eremocossus nubica Yakovlev, 2008
 Eremocossus vaulogeri (Staudinger, 1897)

References

External links

Cossinae
Moth genera